Salience (also called saliency) is that property by which some thing stands out. Salient events are an attentional mechanism by which organisms learn and survive; those organisms can focus their limited perceptual and cognitive resources on the pertinent (that is, salient) subset of the sensory data available to them.

Saliency typically arises from contrasts between items and their neighborhood. They might be represented, for example, by a red dot surrounded by white dots, or by a flickering message indicator of an answering machine, or a loud noise in an otherwise quiet environment. Saliency detection is often studied in the context of the visual system, but similar mechanisms operate in other sensory systems. Just what is salient can be influenced by training: for example, for human subjects particular letters can become salient by training. There can be a sequence of necessary events, each of which has to be salient, in turn, in order for successful training in the sequence; the alternative is a failure, as in an illustrated  sequence when tying a bowline; in the list of illustrations, even the first illustration is a salient: the rope in the list must cross over, and not under the bitter end of the rope (which can remain fixed, and not free to move); failure to notice that the first salient has not been satisfied means the knot will fail to hold, even when the remaining salient events have been satisfied.

When attention deployment is driven by salient stimuli, it is considered to be bottom-up, memory-free, and reactive. Conversely, attention can also be guided by top-down, memory-dependent, or anticipatory mechanisms, such as when looking ahead of moving objects or sideways before crossing streets. Humans and other animals have difficulty paying attention to more than one item simultaneously, so they are faced with the challenge of continuously integrating and prioritizing different bottom-up and top-down influences.

Neuroanatomy
The brain component named the hippocampus helps with the assessment of salience and context by using past memories to filter new incoming stimuli, and placing those that are most important into long term memory. The entorhinal cortex is the pathway into and out of the hippocampus, and is an important part of the brain's memory network; research shows that it is a brain region that suffers damage early on in Alzheimer's disease, one of the effects of which is altered (diminished) salience.

The pulvinar nuclei (in the thalamus) modulate physical/perceptual salience in attentional selection.

One group of neurons (i.e., D1-type medium spiny neurons) within the nucleus accumbens shell (NAcc shell) assigns appetitive motivational salience ("want" and "desire", which includes a motivational component), aka incentive salience, to rewarding stimuli, while another group of neurons (i.e., D2-type medium spiny neurons) within the NAcc shell assigns aversive motivational salience to aversive stimuli.

The primary visual cortex (V1) generates a bottom-up saliency map from visual inputs to guide reflexive attentional shifts or gaze shifts. According to V1 Saliency Hypothesis, the saliency of a location is higher when V1 neurons give higher responses to that location relative to V1 neurons' responses to other visual locations. For example, a unique red item among green items, or a unique vertical bar among horizontal bars, is salient since it evokes higher V1 responses and attracts attention or gaze. The V1 neural responses are sent to the superior colliculus to guide gaze shifts to the salient locations. A fingerprint of the saliency map in V1 is that attention or gaze can be captured by the location of an eye-of-origin singleton in visual inputs, e.g., a bar uniquely shown to the left eye in a background of many other bars shown to the right eye, even when observers cannot tell the difference between the singleton and the background bars.

In psychology
The term is widely used in the study of perception and cognition to refer to any aspect of a stimulus that, for any of many reasons, stands out from the rest. Salience may be the result of emotional, motivational or cognitive factors and is not necessarily associated with physical factors such as intensity, clarity or size. Although salience is thought to determine attentional selection, salience associated with physical factors does not necessarily influence selection of a stimulus.

Salience bias
Salience bias (also known as perceptual salience) is the cognitive bias that predisposes individuals to focus on items that are more prominent or emotionally striking and ignore those that are unremarkable, even though this difference is often irrelevant by objective standards. Salience bias is closely related to the concept of availability in behavioral economics:

In interaction design 
Salience in design draws from the cognitive aspects of attention, and applies it to the making of 2D and 3D objects. When designing computer and screen interfaces, salience helps draw attention to certain objects like buttons and signify affordance, so designers can utilize this aspect of perception to guide users.

There are several variables used to direct attention:

 Color. Hue, saturation, and value can all be used to call attention to areas or objects within an interface, and de-emphasize others. 
 Size. Object size and proportion to surrounding elements creates visual hierarchy, both in interactive elements like buttons, but also within informative elements like text. 
 Position. An object's orientation or spatial arrangement in relation to the surrounding objects creates differentiation to invite action.

Accessibility 
A consideration for salience in interaction design is accessibility. Many interfaces used today rely on visual salience for guiding user interaction, and people with disabilities like color-blindness may have trouble interacting with interfaces using color or contrast to create salience.

Aberrant salience hypothesis of schizophrenia

Kapur (2003) proposed that a hyperdopaminergic state, at a "brain" level of description, leads to an aberrant assignment of salience to the elements of one's experience, at a "mind" level. These aberrant salience attributions have been associated with altered activities in the mesolimbic system, including the striatum, the amygdala, the hippocampus, the parahippocampal gyrus., the anterior cingulate cortex and the insula. Dopamine mediates the conversion of the neural representation of an external stimulus from a neutral bit of information into an attractive or aversive entity, i.e. a salient event. Symptoms of schizophrenia may arise out of 'the aberrant assignment of salience to external objects and internal representations', and antipsychotic medications reduce positive symptoms by attenuating aberrant motivational salience via blockade of the dopamine D2 receptors (Kapur, 2003).

Alternative areas of investigation include supplementary motor areas, frontal eye fields and parietal eye fields. These areas of the brain are involved with calculating predictions and visual salience. Changing expectations on where to look restructures these areas of the brain. This cognitive repatterning can result in some of the symptoms found in such disorders.

Visual saliency modeling

In the domain of psychology, efforts have been made in modeling the mechanism of human attention, including the learning of prioritizing the different bottom-up and top-down influences.

In the domain of computer vision, efforts have been made in modeling the mechanism of human attention, especially the bottom-up attentional mechanism, including both spatial and temporal attention. Such a process is also called visual saliency detection.

Generally speaking, there are two kinds of models to mimic the bottom-up saliency mechanism. One way is based on the spatial contrast analysis: for example, a center-surround mechanism is used to define saliency across scales, which is inspired by the putative neural mechanism. The other way is based on the frequency domain analysis. While they used the amplitude spectrum to assign saliency to rarely occurring magnitudes, Guo et al. use the phase spectrum instead.
Recently, Li et al. introduced a system that uses both the amplitude and the phase information.

A key limitation in many such approaches is their computational complexity leading to less than real-time performance, even on modern computer hardware. Some recent work attempts to overcome these issues at the expense of saliency detection quality under some conditions. Other work suggests that saliency and associated speed-accuracy phenomena may be a fundamental mechanisms determined during recognition through gradient descent, needing not be spatial in nature.

See also 
 Availability heuristic
 Dopamine hypothesis of schizophrenia
 Latent inhibition
 Schizophrenia
 Schizotypy
 Spatial attention
 Temporal attention

References

External links 
 
 iLab at the University of Southern California
 Scholarpedia article on visual saliency by Prof. Laurent Itti
 
Saliency map at Scholarpedia

Cognitive neuroscience
Neuropsychology
Attention
Computer vision